Josep "Pep" Sánchez Galobardes (born 8 June 1976) is a former field hockey midfielder from Spain. He represented the men's national team at two consecutive Summer Olympics, starting in 2000.

Notes

References

External links 
 
 
 
 

1976 births
Living people
Field hockey players from Catalonia
Spanish male field hockey players
Male field hockey midfielders
Sportspeople from Terrassa
Olympic field hockey players of Spain
1998 Men's Hockey World Cup players
Field hockey players at the 2000 Summer Olympics
2002 Men's Hockey World Cup players
Field hockey players at the 2004 Summer Olympics